is a Japanese comedian, actor and television presenter who is the leader and the boke of the owarai kombi Cocorico with his partner Shozo Endo. He has appeared in many television programmes and films. He is known for being a regular member of Downtown no Gaki no Tsukai ya Arahende!!, which he and Endo have worked on since 1997.

Tanaka is also known for his love of animals, especially sea creatures, and on 24 June 2018, he became the Marine Stewardship Council ambassador for Japan.

Filmography

Current appearances

TV programmes
Regular programmes
ZIP! (6 Oct 2016 –, NTV) – Thursday Main Personality
Kinkyu SOS! Ike no Mizu zenbu Nuku (15 Jan 2017 –, TX) – MC
Life!: Jinsei ni Sasageru Conte series-6 (13 Apr 2018 –, NHK G)
Tokoro JAPAN (October 29, 2018 -, Kansai TV / Fuji TV) - Semi-regular
Academy Night G (April 2, 2019 -, TBS) - MC
I Am Bouken Shonen (April 23, 2014 - March 26, 2015 and May 25, 2020 -, TBS)

Internet
YoshiLog (GyaO!)*Monthly regular
Gokuraku Tonbo KakeruTV (2017–, AbemaTV AbemaGolden9)*Quasi-regular

Former programmes
Music×Drama Special M no Shikai-sha (13 Oct 2006, CX) - Starring; as Susumu Kozukue
Rankin no Paradise (24 Nov 2006 – 12 Sep 2008, MBS–TBS)
~Geodeki! Pop Company~ Pop-ya (7 Apr – 22 Sep 2008, CX)
Ojomama! F (Apr 2008 – Mar 2009, KTV)
Check! The No.1 (Oct 2008 – Mar 2009, MBS–TBS)
Tobidase! Kagaku-kun (Apr 2009 – Sep 2011, TBS)
Cocorico Naoki Tanaka no Onomichi Photo Sanpo (19 Sep 2009, HTV)
Uchimura–Tanaka no Shirarezaru How-to Sekai Tadashī Sora no Tobikata (9 Oct 2009, CX)
Chō Heibon Hakase Tanaka (5 Nov 2011 – 30 Mar 2013, TBS)
Cocorico Naoki Tanaka no  (3 Apr 2012 – 19 Mar 2013, NHK E)- Navigator
TV de Chūgoku-go (8 Jul 2012, NHK BS Premium)
Life!: Jinsei ni Sasageru Conte series-0 to 5 (1 Sep 2012 – , NHK G)
Quiz 100-Ninriki (27 Oct 2012 – Mar 2015, NHK G)
Conte no Gekijō: The Actors' Comedy (26 Jan, 31 May, 30 Aug, 29 Nov 2013, NHK BS Premium)
100% Entertainment (18 Feb 2013, GT)
Měi! Shàonǚ shèngdiǎn(24 Jun 2013, EBC dōngsēn zònghé)
Mimura & Ariyoshi Tokuban (8 Jan 2014 - 7 Jun 2015, TV Asahi)
Tan Q! A Trip (24 Jan 2015 – 19 Mar 2016, TVA)- Monthly
1-Ko dake Yellow (24 Apr 2015 – 30 Mar 2017, NBN) – MC
Shitteru or Shittaka? Quiz! Balevel no Tō (17 Oct 2015, ABC)
Uta no Golden Hit (October 2, 2017, TBS)
Tetsuko no Heya (23 Jul, 2018, TV Asahi)
Nihon Sōzō Kikō: Watisuto (7 Apr 2018 –June 23, 2018 , BS11) - MC

TV dramas
Moero!! Robocon (1 Aug 1999, EX) – as Passerby
Yonimo Kimyōna Monogatari Autumn Special Edition "" (Sep 1999, CX) – Starring as Shimura
Ashita Ga Arusa (2001, NTV)
Gakko no Sensei (2001, TBS) – as Atsushi Onodera
Kaiki Daisakusen: Second File (Apr 2007, BS-hi) – Starring; as Kyosuke Misawa
Mirai Yuenchi (28 Sep 2007, EX) – Starring; as Tatsuya Hasebe
Loss:Time:Life (8 Mar 2008, CX) – Starring; as Koichi Kitazawa
Mirai Yuenchi 2 (28 Mar 2008, EX)
Reset (15 Jan 2009, NTV) – Starring as Henry
Renzoku Drama Shōsetsu Kinoshita-buchō to Boku (2010, YTV) – as Daisuke Kanagawa
Honjitsu wa Taian Nari (2012, NHK) – as Junichi Tokura
Platina Town (2012, Wowow) – as Kotaro Ushijima
Yūsha Yoshihiko to Akuryō no Kagi (7 Dec 2012, TX) – as Morgan
Link (2013, Wowow) – as Tsutomu Sawada
Isha-ryō Bengoshi: Anata no Namida, Okane ni Kaemashou (Jan–Mar 2014, YTV) – Starring as Yukio Hakamada
Alice no Toge (Apr–Jun 2014, TBS) – as Junichi Chihara
Mother Game: Kanojo-tachi no Kaikyū (Apr–Jun 2015, TBS) – as Okinawa Ward Office official
I'm Home (23 Apr 2015, EX) – as Toshi Yamanobe
KariKare (Nov 2015, NHK BS Premium) – as Yoshiharu Sano
Neko Zamurai Tamanojō Edo e Iku (Feb 2016, JAITS co-production) – Starring; as Himatsu
Eiko Kyōju no Jiken-bo (21 May 2016, EX) – as Haruto Nanba
Asa ga Kuru (Jun–Jul 2016, THB–CX) – as Kiyokazu Kurihara
Suna no Tō~Shiri sugita Rinjin (Oct–Dec 2016, TBS) – as Kenichi Takano
Kasei Otto no Mitazono (Oct–Dec 2016, EX) – as Kengo Tomita
Masuyama Chō Nōryoku-shi Jimusho (5 Jan – Mar 2017, YTV) – Starring as Keitaro Masuyama
Jiro Asada: Prison Hotel (Oct–Dec 2017, BS Japan) – Starring as Kazuma Hanazawa
Keishichō Zero Gakari ~ Seikatsu Anzen-ka Nan Demo Sōdan-shitsu ~ THIRD SEASON, Episode 3 (August 17, 2018, TV TOKYO) – As himself
Harassment Game, Episode 1 (October 15, 2018, TV TOKYO) – as Muto Yuzuru
Wagaya no himitsu, Episode 1 (March 3, 2019, NHK BS Premium) – as Kiyoshi Yamamoto
EdoMoiselle ~ Reiwa de koi, itashinsu ~ (January, 7, 2021 - , YTV) – as Yuhiko Kurachi
The 13 Lords of the Shogun (2022, NHK) – as Kujō Kanezane

Internet dramas
Utsunuke (scheduled Fall 2018) – Starring; as Keiichi Tanaka

Films
Minna no Ie (2001) – as Naosuke Iijima*won the Japan Academy Film Prize New Actor Award
Walking with the Dog (2004) – Starring; as Yasuyuki Okamura
Gyakkyō Nine (2005) – as Takeshi Sakakibara
The Uchōten Hotel (2006) – as Naosuke Iijima*Cameo appearance
Forbidden Siren (2006) – as Yutaka Minamida
Argentine Hag (2007) – as Mamoru Mukai
Fine, Totally Fine (2007) – as Yuhara
The Glorious Team Batista (2008) – as Makoto Himuro
Zebraman 2: Attack on Zebra City (2010) – as Zebraman TV ver./Junichi Ichiba
Welcome Home, Hayabusa (2012) – as Daigo Iwamatsu
Da Color?~The Datsugoku Survival (2016) – Starring
Neko Zamurai Tamanojō Edo e Iku (2016) – as Himatsu (Hikuaku)
Kin Medal Otoko (2016) – as Nakano-sensei
Masuyama Chō Nōryoku-shi Jimusho: Gekijō-ban wa Koi no Aji (2018) – Starring; as Keitaro Masuyama
Kaitou Sentai Lupinranger VS Keisatsu Sentai Patranger: en film (2018) – as Herlock Sholmes/Unknown Gangler Monster
Organ (2019) – as Shigeru Wakimoto
Ox-Head Village (2022)

Stage
OneOr8: Bakugyaku no Inu (2008)

TV anime
Oden-kun (Apr 2005 – Feb 2009, NHK E) – as Kamisama
Ganbare! Oden-kun (Jan 2013 – Dec 2014, ABC) – as Kamisama
It is Living Happily on Ground Every Day (Apr 2013 – Mar 2014, NHK BS Premium) – Narrator

Anime films
Summer Days with Coo (2007) – as Yasuo Uehara
Hutch the Honeybee (2010) – as Kunekune
Kuma no Gakkō (2010) – as Katie's Papa
Crayon Shin-chan: Fierceness That Invites Storm! Me and the Space Princess (2012) – as Ikemen De Ikemen Gundan member
Violence Voyager (2019) – as George

Dubbing
Son of the Mask (2005) – as Tim
The Final Destination (2009) – as Nick O'Bannon
Amazonia (2015) – Narrator
Jurassic World (2017, NTV ver.) – as Jimmy Fallon
Space Jam: A New Legacy (2021) – as The Brow

Documentaries
NHK Special Yamai no Kigen Prologue Jinrui Shinka 700 Man-nen no Shukumei (18 May 2013, NHK)

DVD
Personal Katsudō – From 26 October 2005, Tanaka himself released a volume of his conte DVDs every three months, and ended with five volumes

Internet
Yoshimoto Online "Yoshomoto Gakuen! Yahoo! Sensei" (2009 – 2011, Yoshimoto Gekijō, Saturdays 22:00–23:20)
Tanaka • Nemu no Hirameke! Denkikki (2017-2019, KawaiianTV)

In-flight programmes
JAL original in-flight programme Yoshimoto JALTV First Shot (Dec 2009 – Jan 2010, screened in Japan Airlines)

Advertisements
JA Bank
Kao Corporation Humming Fine – Co-starred with Yō Yoshida
Promise - with Rei Okamoto, Junpei Mizobata and Naomi Nishida

Serialisations
National Geographic Channel – Column serialisations on its official website. "Cocorico Tanaka no " (Jun 2015 –)

Books
Cocorico Tanaka x Naganuma Takeshi presents Zukai Ikimono Ga Miteiru Sekai (July, 2015、Gakken Publishing)

Awards
 25th Japan Academy Film Prize - Rookie Of The Year and Popularity (Minna No Ie)
 The 29th The Television Drama Academy Awards - New Actor Award (Ashita ga Arusa)
 Warai No Saiten!! The Dream Match '05 (With Masakazu Mimura)

Publications
Cocorico Tanaka×Takeshi Naganuma presents Zukai: Ikimono ga Miteiru Sekai (Jul 2015, Gakken Publishing)

References

Japanese comedians
Japanese television personalities
Japanese television presenters
Japanese male voice actors
Living people
People from Toyonaka, Osaka
Year of birth missing (living people)